R v Viljoen is an important case in South African law. It was heard in the Appellate Division on 23 April 1941, with judgment handed down on 6 May. De Wet CJ, Watermeyer JA, Tindall JA, Centlivres JA, and Feetham JA presided.

Facts 
A statement had been made by the accused to a peace officer without compliance with the formalities prescribed by section 273(1) of the Criminal Procedure and Evidence Act.

Judgment 
That statement, the court found, although it was capable of implying an admission of guilt, was also capable of a rational explanation, which did not include any such admission. The court held, therefore, that the statement was not a confession within the meaning of the section.

See also 
 Confession (law)
 Crime in South Africa
 Evidence (law)
 Law of South Africa
 South African criminal law
 South African criminal procedure

References

Case law 
 R v Viljoen 1941 AD 366.

Legislation 
 Criminal Procedure and Evidence Act 31 of 1917.

Notes 

Appellate Division (South Africa) cases
1941 in South African law
1941 in case law